Michael "Mike" David Westhues (January 22, 1949 – February 17, 2013) was an American-born Finnish singer-songwriter and guitarist.

Westhues was born in Moberly, Missouri.  In 1971, he set off to see the world, ending up in Finland, where he was extremely active in the Finnish music scene, working with such groups as the Finnish progressive rock band Wigwam, its lead vocalist Jim Pembroke and Finnish blues artist Dave Lindholm. A couple of years later, Westhues moved to Uppsala, Sweden, then on to London and then back to Finland. At the end of the 1970s, he moved back to the US, to Indianapolis, with his Finnish wife and son. In 2004, they decided to move back to Finland, where he lived until his death in Espoo, on February 17, 2013.

Discography
New Morning Train, EMI Records, 1972
A Man Name A' Jones, Love Records, 1974
Good-Bye Rosalita, Love Records, 1976
Jim/Mike And The Leadswingers, Love Records, 1977
Vanha Isäntä, Hi-Hat Records, 1978
Missin' Bill Blues, Tenex Records, 1982
Frozen Hay, RFD Records, 1991
Streetlight Reflections, RFD Records, 1993
See Your Eyes, RFD Records, 1997
Ain't No Money In Love, Instant Records, 2001
Shades of Blue, Bluelight Records, 2007
Dumbflakes for Breakfast, Humble House Records, 2008
Alder Hill, Humble House Records, 2013

References

External links
Mike Westhues' official website
Mike Westhues' MySpace site

Finnish male singer-songwriters
Finnish guitarists
Finnish male guitarists
American male guitarists
1949 births
2013 deaths
Finnish people of American descent
Guitarists from Missouri
People from Moberly, Missouri
20th-century American guitarists
20th-century American male musicians
American male singer-songwriters
Singer-songwriters from Missouri